The Government of the Co-operative Republic of Guyana exempts visa requirements for nationals of specific countries or territories. All visitors must hold a passport valid for 6 months.

Visa policy map

Visa exemptions
Nationals of the following 57 countries and territories are exempt from obtaining a visa for Guyana for stays of up to 90 days, except as otherwise noted:

 - Applies to holders of passports for public affairs only.

Nationals of the following countries are exempt from obtaining a visa for stays of up to 90 days if they hold a valid visa issued by Canada, the United States or a Schengen member state:

 (if travelling on business}

Visas are not required for nationals of any country who were born in Guyana as per their travel document.

Visa on arrival
Nationals of the following countries can obtain a visa on arrival:

Citizens of other countries traveling as tourists can obtain a visa on arrival for a stay of up to 30 days with an invitation letter from a sponsor or host approved by the Immigration Department.

They can apply to extend their stay.

Transit without a visa
Travellers holding onward tickets may transit without a visa through airports in Guyana for 7 hours, except for nationals of Armenia, Azerbaijan, Belarus, Bulgaria, China, Czech Republic, Georgia, Hungary, Kazakhstan, Kyrgyzstan, Moldova, Mongolia, Montenegro, Poland, Romania, Serbia, Slovakia, Tajikistan, Turkmenistan, Ukraine, Uzbekistan and Vietnam.

Holders of diplomatic, official, service or special passports
Holders of the following types of passports may also enter Guyana without a visa:

See also

Visa requirements for Guyanese citizens
List of diplomatic missions of Guyana

Notes

References

Foreign relations of Guyana
Guyana